The canton of Saint-Pierre-des-Corps is an administrative division of the Indre-et-Loire department, central France. Its borders were modified at the French canton reorganisation which came into effect in March 2015. Its seat is in Saint-Pierre-des-Corps.

It consists of the following communes:
Saint-Avertin
Saint-Pierre-des-Corps

References

Cantons of Indre-et-Loire